The 2019 iHeartRadio Music Awards was held at Microsoft Theater in Los Angeles on March 14, 2019, and was broadcast live on Fox. Ariana Grande and Ella Mai were the most awarded artists, each winning three iHeartRadio Music Awards on the night. Cardi B lead the list of nominees with 14 nominations. T-Pain, who won The Masked Singer, hosted the show.

Performances

Winners and nominees

Winners are shown in Boldtype.

References

2019
2019 music awards
2019 in Los Angeles
2019 awards in the United States
March 2019 events in the United States